This is a list of casual vacancies in the Tasmanian House of Assembly since 1965. Casual vacancies in the House of Assembly are filled by a countback of the votes of the departing member.

References

 Results of All Countbacks to Fill House of Assembly Casual Vacancies, under the Tasmanian Electoral Act, for the 45 years from 1965 to 2011

See also

 Members of the Tasmanian House of Assembly

Tasmanian House of Assembly
Tasmania-related lists